Gordon Smith (February 14, 1908 – October 22, 1999) was an American ice hockey player who competed in the 1932 Winter Olympics and 1936 Winter Olympics.

Early life 
Smith was a native of Winchester, Massachusetts. He briefly attended Boston University before playing for the Boston Olympics and Boston Hockey Club.

Career 
Smith was a member of the United States men's national ice hockey team, which won the silver medal at the 1932 Winter Olympics in Lake Placid, New York. He played one match and scored one goal. Four years later, he was again member of the American ice hockey team, which won the bronze medal. He played all eight matches and scored one goal.

Death 
Smith died in Westwood, Massachusetts.

External links

References 

1908 births
1999 deaths
American men's ice hockey forwards
Boston Olympics players
Ice hockey players at the 1932 Winter Olympics
Ice hockey players at the 1936 Winter Olympics
Medalists at the 1932 Winter Olympics
Medalists at the 1936 Winter Olympics
Olympic bronze medalists for the United States in ice hockey
Olympic silver medalists for the United States in ice hockey

People from Winchester, Massachusetts